This is a timeline of manifolds, one of the major geometric concepts of mathematics. For further background see history of manifolds and varieties.

Background 
Manifolds in contemporary mathematics come in a number of types. These include:

 smooth manifolds, which are basic in calculus in several variables, mathematical analysis and differential geometry;
 piecewise-linear manifolds;
 topological manifolds.

There are also related classes, such as homology manifolds and orbifolds, that resemble manifolds. It took a generation for clarity to emerge, after the initial work of Henri Poincaré, on the fundamental definitions; and a further generation to discriminate more exactly between the three major classes. Low-dimensional topology (i.e., dimensions 3 and 4, in practice) turned out to be more resistant than the higher dimension, in clearing up Poincaré's legacy. Further developments brought in fresh geometric ideas, concepts from quantum field theory, and heavy use of category theory.

Participants in the first phase of axiomatization were influenced by David Hilbert: with Hilbert's axioms as exemplary, by Hilbert's third problem as solved by Dehn, one of the actors, by Hilbert's fifteenth problem from the needs of 19th century geometry. The subject matter of manifolds is a strand common to algebraic topology, differential topology and geometric topology.

Timeline to 1900 and Henri Poincaré

1900 to 1920

1920 to the 1945 axioms for homology

1945 to 1960
Terminology: By this period manifolds are generally assumed to be those of Veblen-Whitehead, so locally Euclidean Hausdorff spaces, but the application of countability axioms was also becoming standard. Veblen-Whitehead did not assume, as Kneser earlier had, that manifolds are second countable. The term "separable manifold", to distinguish second countable manifolds, survived into the late 1950s.

1961 to 1970

1971–1980

1981–1990

1991–2000

2001–present

See also 
differentiable stack
factorization homology
Kuranishi theory
Floer homology
Glossary of algebraic topology
Timeline of bordism

Notes

Manifolds
Historical timelines
Mathematics timelines